The Yinsugaiti Glacier is located in Shaksgam River basin, north-west of K2 peak on the northern slope of the Karakoram Range. The glacier is about 41.5 kilometres long, covering an area of 392.4 square kilometres.  It is China's largest glacier valley.

References

See also 
 Sarpo Laggo Glacier
 Trans-Karakoram Tract
 Dafdar
 Shaksgam River

Glaciers of China
Glaciers of the Karakoram
Karakoram
Valleys of Xinjiang